Kaaval may refer to:
Kaaval (2015 film), a Tamil-language film
Kaaval (2021 film), a Malayalam-language film